The Curaçao national rugby union team represents Curaçao in the sport of rugby union. The team plays international matches against other countries in the Caribbean region.

The team played its first international match at the 2013 NACRA Rugby Championship.

Current squad
Squad to the 2015 NACRA Rugby Championship:
Glenno Fransman 
Edel Calmes 
Carlos Hernandez 
Eelco te Molder*
Marius van Noort 
Paulo de Sousa Feirra (c) 
Emanuel Koenders 
Junnyfer Fidanque 
Oscar Abril-Bonthuis 
Robert Perry
Curtleyson Martis
Derk Sonnenberg 
Arlito dos Passos 
Jedrick Magdalena 
Charlie Dekker 
Substitutes
Arthur Hogesteger 
Mark Verburg 
Varley Felipa*
Duran Sikkerlad 
Erik Linsen 
Ulrich Tomasa 
Lando Pieters 
Jerwien Maduro

 * newly capped players

Record

Overall

See also
 Curaçao Rugby Federation

External links
 Curaçao Rugby Federation on facebook.com

References

Rugby union in Curaçao
National sports teams of Curaçao
2013 establishments in Curaçao